The 2006–07 Austrian Football Bundesliga was the 95th season of top-tier football in Austria. The competition is officially called T-Mobile Bundesliga, named after the Austrian branch of German mobile phone company T-Mobile. The season started on 18 July 2006, and the 36th and last round of matches took place on 20 May 2007.

League table

Results
Teams played each other four times in the league. In the first half of the season each team played every other team twice (home and away), and then did the same in the second half of the season.

First half of season

Second half of season

Top goalscorers

References

External links
 Bundesliga website 
 OEFB 

Austrian Football Bundesliga seasons
Austria
1